Kamin-Kashyrskyi is a town in Volyn Oblast, Ukraine. It is the administrative center of Kamin-Kashyrskyi Raion. Population:

Name
"Kamień" means stone in Polish, "Kamin" fireplace in German, the suffix "-ski" means of or from, "Koszyr"' is an ancient prominent Polish family name, or "Kashyr" aka "Kasher" means kosher or 49  in Hebrew. According to Ancient Poland Michael Balinski (Warsaw 1845), a Prince Koshyrski was known for his religious orthodoxy and generosity to houses of prayer and was responsible for erecting a Dominican monastery in Kamin. Therefore, the name origin is most likely Koszyr's fireplace, but could also mean Kosher Fireplace or 49 Stones.

People/Ethnicity
The area has been historically a mix of Polish, Russian and Ukrainian peoples for more than a millennium.  The region has been subject to a great many wars, pogroms, rulers and empires for centuries, including Habsburg, Polish Lithuania, Prussia, Poland, Russia, and German.  It is now part of Ukraine.  
Major religions practiced include: Catholic, Russian Orthodox, Ukrainian Orthodox, and Judaism.  At the turn of the century, 1900, the area was reported to be populated by villages of Christian farmers and a few Jewish villages engaged in trade, as artisans and as professionals.

History
Great Soviet Russian Encyclopedia says "Kamen-Kashirskiy is on the river Zyr, a tributary of the River Prypiat the town was known already at the beginning of the 12th. Century. Situated in Wolyn."

The Encyclopaedia Judaica comments: "Kamen-Kashirskiy, a small town in Poland, the county of Polesia. In 1847 there were 862 Jews living there; in 1897 there were 1189 Jews (in a total of 1220 residents); in 1921 – 716 Jews." 

It was part of Second Polish Republic between 1918 and 1939 was a powiat center in Polesie Voivodeship.

Just prior to the outbreak of World War II on September I, 1939, it is estimated that more than 2000 Jews lived in the town. On August 1, 1941, a squadron of the 2nd Cavalry Regiment arrived in the town from Ratno. One day later, they arrested and shot 8 male Jews. On August 22, 1941, a detachment of the Security Police subordinated to Einsatzgruppe C arrested all Jewish males aged between 16 and 60. The next day, they shot 80 male Jews in a forest 5 kilometers west of the town. In the fall of 1941, the Jews were ordered to inhabit an "open ghetto" but in March 1942, this ghetto, by the order of the Gebietskommissar, became an "enclosed ghetto". Altogether, 2 300 Jews resided in the ghetto area. The first mass action was perpetrated on August 10, 1942, by the German Security Police from Brzesc with the assistance of the local German Gendarmerie and the Ukrainian Auxiliary Police. Some 50 families were shot in the Jewish cemetery as well as 130 Gypsies. On November 2, 1942, 400 Jews escaped from the ghetto. Most of the Jews soon died of starvation or disease in the forest.

References
The Towns as They Were in Their Time and Place 

Cities in Volyn Oblast
Volhynian Governorate
Volhynian Voivodeship (1569–1795)
Polesie Voivodeship
Cities of district significance in Ukraine
Holocaust locations in Ukraine